Agios Konstantinos (before 1930: Ραγκόξαινα or Ρεγκόζενα - Ragkoxaina or Regkozena) is a village in the municipal unit of Pellana, Laconia, Greece.

References

Populated places in Laconia